The Battle of Halule took place in 691 BC between the Assyrian empire and the rebelling forces of the Babylonians, Chaldeans, Persians, Medes, Elamites and Aramaic tribes.

Background 
During the reign of King Sennacherib of Assyria, Babylonia was in a constant state of revolt. Mushezib-Marduk the Chaldean prince chosen as King of Babylon led the Babylonian populace in revolt against Assyria and King Sennacherib.

Rebellion forces 
Achaemenes recruited a new army to help the Babylonians against the Assyrians, under the leadership of Mushezib-Marduk. As well as the Babylonians, the Aramaic tribes, the Chaldeans and King Khumban-umena III of the Elamites, and all the Zagros Iranians (Persia, Anzan, Ellipi, etc.) joined in rebellion against the Assyrians. The nucleus of the army consisted of Elamite, Median and Persian charioteers, infantry, and cavalrymen.

Result 

The battle was indecisive, or at least both sides claimed the victory in their annals and all rulers remained on their thrones. However, Sennacherib captured Babylon after a 9 month siege and Ashurbanipal destroyed Elam after 40 years of fighting. 

Mushezib-Marduk lost his ally when the Elamite king Humban-nimena suffered a stroke later that same year, an opportunity King Sennacherib quickly seized by attacking Babylon, and eventually capturing it after a nine-month siege. Babylon was destroyed by Sennacherib. The Persians and Medes were then subjugated. There was further fighting between Elam and Assyria over the next 40 years until Elam was destroyed by Ashurbanipal.

References

Battles involving Assyria
Battles involving Babylonia
690s BC
7th-century BC conflicts
7th century BC
Sennacherib
Chaldea